The 1996 Supercopa Libertadores was the ninth season of the Supercopa Libertadores, a club football tournament for past Copa Libertadores winners. Vélez Sarsfield won the competition for the first time, defeating Cruzeiro 3–0 on aggregate in the final.

Teams

Preliminary round
The matches were played from 21 August to 2 October.

With 17 teams taking part, the first round consisted of 7 two-legged and a round robin group consisting of the remaining 3 teams.

Knockout phase

Bracket

Quarterfinals
The matches were played from 16 October to 24 October.

Semifinals
The matches were played from 30 October to 14 November.

Finals

Vélez Sarsfield won 3–0 on aggregate.

See also
List of Copa Libertadores winners
1996 Copa Libertadores
1997 Recopa Sudamericana

External links
RSSSF

Supercopa Libertadores
2